Institutiones calculi integralis (Foundations of integral calculus) is a three-volume textbook written by Leonhard Euler and published in 1768. It was on the subject of integral calculus and contained many of Euler's discoveries about differential equations.

See also
 Institutiones calculi differentialis

External links
 Full text available from Archive.org.
 Full text (1768) available from books.google.com.
  provides a complete English translation of Euler's Institutiones calculi integralis by Ian Bruce.
 German translation Vollständige Anleitung zur Integralrechnung (1828) available from e-rara.ch.

Mathematics textbooks
1768 books
Leonhard Euler
18th-century Latin books